Coleophora manitoba is a moth of the family Coleophoridae. It is found in Canada, including Manitoba.

References

manitoba
Moths described in 1915
Moths of North America